Schreider is a Northern American family name. Notable people with the surname include:

Helen Schreider (b. 1926), American explorer
Gary Schreider (1934–2011), Canadian football player
Frank Schreider (1924–1994), American explorer

Fictional people 

 Schreider (or Shredder), a character of Log Horizon

See also 
 Schröder
 Schreiter

English-language surnames